The Yamaga Formation is a palaeontological formation located in Japan. It dates to the Upper Oligocene period.

See also 
 List of fossil sites

Further reading 
  (1993); Wildlife of Gondwana. Reed. 

Geologic formations of Japan
Paleogene System of Asia
Paleogene Japan
Oligocene Series
Oligocene paleontological sites
Paleontology in Japan